"Crisis" was the 45th episode of M*A*S*H, and the 21st episode of the second series.  It was first transmitted on February 9, 1974.

Overview
When the supply lines are cut, Henry Blake declares a state of emergency and delegates various tasks to the officers in an effort to keep the camp running.  As heating fuel and toilet paper run low, the members of the 4077th are forced to operate in the cold, scrounge every bit of spare paper in the camp and double up in sleeping quarters.

The surgeons, along with Radar, Klinger and Father Mulcahy, spend restless nights cramped together.  Meanwhile, Henry's desk begins to disappear by degrees as people become desperate for firewood.  Klinger attempts to bunk with the nurses, and Hawkeye and Trapper attack Frank in an effort to share the warmth from his electric socks.  Through it all, the influx of wounded remains constant.  Things seem to be at their breaking point when a supply truck finally arrives to restock the camp.

The episode ends with Henry sitting in his bare office, it having been stripped of every piece of furniture.

Jeff Maxwell makes his first series appearance as camp cook Igor.

External links 
 

M*A*S*H (season 2) episodes
1974 American television episodes